Khuru (Dzongkha: ཁུ་རུ་; Wylie: khu-ru) is a traditional Bhutanese sport.
A short segment of the BBC TV programme 'Lost Land of the Tiger' (series 1, episode 2: 2010), filmed at a village game in the southeast of the country, implies the following features:

1. It is a team sport. It seems to involve about 8 to 12 players, but the number of teams is not mentioned.

2. Competitors (all adult males in the clip, although there is a woman instructing the guest) take turns to throw two darts, one after the other.

3. These darts are wooden sticks, approximately 20 cm long, with a sharp point at the tip, a bone, wood, or metal collar surrounding the middle 6 cm or so (acting as a handle and to give the projectile enough weight to fly and embed), and four wooden fins at the rear.

4. The target is a wooden flat-sided post, perhaps 50 cm tall, 15 cm wide, and 8 cm thick, stuck into the ground in front of a low bank. Its top is rounded. The front, sides, and top of the post are wrapped in white paper, and the front face has a design marked on it in, seemingly drawn with a black marker pen. Around the curved top is an arc of six small stars.  Beneath this is a circle about 4 cm in diameter, with a still smaller circle within it. Directly beneath this is a line, bowed slightly downwards in the middle. A second line, more deeply bowed, appears beneath this, meeting the edges of the post at the same points. A short horizontal mark appears midway between these two curved lines. Beneath the lower curve, and roughly midway up the post, is a circle almost the full width of the post, with a small (approximately 4 cm in diameter) circle within it.  A feint figure '2' appears below this. The lowest 15 cm or so of the face is marked off by a horizontal line, below which is a pattern composed of numerous crosses and a curtain-like design.  The significance of these markings is not explained, but the middle concentric circles resemble a target.

5. Over this post is an arch made of thin branches, approximately semicircular, and about 120 cm in diameter.  At the points where this arch is embedded in the ground, two wooden uprights are erected, approximately 2.5 metres high.

6. Other players (or perhaps judges or helpers) stand close to the target, wearing large white cuffs around their wrists, seemingly helping to indicate the target.

7. The 'court' appears to be double ended, because another, similar target can be glimpsed just behind the thrower.

8. The game is preceded and followed by singing and dancing.

Bhutanese instructors in an annual sports' week event at ICIMOD introduced these Khuru rules:

1. At least two teams play the game, but a larger reasonable number is allowed. The usual number of players in a team is 5, but there can be fewer or more depending on availability.

2. Competitors (teams can be single gender or mixed, there are no strict rules about that) in pairs from opposite teams throw two darts one after another, then it is turn for another pair until all the players have had their turn. This is the end of one round.

3. The game can be played on a round or points basis. The usual game consists of three rounds and the team with highest score wins.

4. The points are scored if:

 the dart sticks to the ground and its wooden handle is closer than about 20 cm from the target, verified by a designated stick (1 point)
 the dart hits the target and leaves a mark (1 point)
 hits the target and sticks (2 points)
 hits the bull's eye (~2 cm diameter circle in the middle of the target) (3 points)

5. The court is double ended and, once the round is finished, both teams go to the opposite end, points are counted and verified, competitors collect their own darts and the second round starts with target now on the opposite side.

See also
Jarts
Sports in Bhutan

References

External links
Khuru | Why Bhutan's Traditional Sport is growing in popularity | Trans World Sport

Sport in Bhutan
Sports originating in Bhutan
Darts variants